The Society of Iranian Calligraphists is an Iranian organization for professionals in the field of calligraphy. It was established in 1951.

Instagram Official Page 

The Instagram Official page
started in 15 November 2019. This page promotes Calligraphery arts of masters.

External links
 Official website (English version)

Islamic calligraphy
Cultural organisations based in Iran
Professional associations based in Iran